Marcus Anthony Hall (born August 6, 1985) is an American professional basketball player for Manisa Belediye Spor of the Turkish Basketball League. The 6'2" guard played college basketball for the University of Colorado.

High school career
Hall attended Jersey Village High School in Houston, Texas where he was a three-time winner of Jersey Village's best offensive player and was a two-time all-district and school's most valuable player as a junior and senior. In addition to basketball in high school, Hall was a standout performer on the track, earning all-district champion honors in the high jump, 300 hurdles, 4x400 meters and 4x100 relay.

College career
In his freshman season at Colorado, Hall played in all 29 games and had six starting assignments. He averaged 5.0 points, 1.3 rebounds and 1.6 assists in 15.1 minutes per game.

In his sophomore season, Hall played in all 29 games and had 21 starting assignments. He was one of three players that averaged over double-digits as he was third in team scoring (11.2 ppg) and first in assists (4.4 apg). He was also second in field goals made (118), third in starts (21), fourth in three-pointers (38).

In his junior season, Hall played in all 30 games and had 23 starting assignments. He was the team leader in assists (124) at 4.1 per game and finished sixth in all games played among Big 12 players. He was the third on the team in scoring averaging 8.7 points per game while also averaging 2.6 rebounds and 1.3 steals per game.

After redshirting the 2006–07 season, Hall returned for the Buffaloes in 2007–08 where he started all 32 games. He averaged 14.0 points, 3.9 rebounds, 4.0 assists and 1.8 steals in 37.6 minutes per game. He became the 26th Colorado player to score 1,000 career points and finished fourth all-time in assists (423). He also finished tied for third in career games played (120) and graduated from Colorado with a double major in sociology and ethnic studies.

Professional career
After going undrafted in the 2008 NBA draft, Hall joined the New York Knicks for the 2008 NBA Summer League where he averaged 4.3 points, 1.5 rebounds and 2.0 assists in four games. On September 19, 2008, he signed a one-year deal with Levski Sofia of the Bulgarian National Basketball League.

On July 21, 2009, Hall signed a two-year deal with Fastweb Casale of the Lega Basket Serie A. In December 2009, he left Casale after 13 games. In February 2010, he joined APOEL of Cyprus but left after just one EuroChallenge game. Later that month, he signed with Kepez Belediyespor of Turkey for the rest of the 2009–10 season. He later re-signed with Belediyespor for the 2010–11 season.

On August 25, 2011, Hall returned to Levski Sofia, signing with the club for the 2011–12 season.

In September 2012, Hall signed with Darüşşafaka of Turkey for the 2012–13 season.

In September 2013, Hall signed with Yeşilgiresun Belediye for the 2013–14 season.

On November 1, 2014, Hall was selected by the Fort Wayne Mad Ants in the fourth round of the 2014 NBA Development League Draft. On February 19, 2015, he was released by the Mad Ants. On March 17, he was acquired by the Iowa Energy. On July 8, he returned to Turkey, this time with Afyonkarahisar Belediyespor.

The Basketball Tournament (TBT) (2015–Present) 
In the summer of 2016, in The Basketball Tournament on ESPN Marcus lead Team Colorado (Colorado Alumni) to the finals as the West Regional Champs, and ended up losing the $2 million prize in the final seconds to Overseas Elite 77–72. Hall was voted the 2016 TBT MVP on twitter. He averaged 24.6 points per game.
In the summer of 2017, he averaged 28.3 points per game.  Hall also shot 82 percent on the foul line.  As a No. 1 seed in the West Region, Hall helped take Team Colorado to the Super 16 Round, but was defeated by Armored Athlete 84–75. 
As of summer 2021 he is Top 10 in TBT history both in points and 3 pointers made.

Career statistics

National leagues

|-
| align="left" | 2008–09
| align="left" | Levski Sofia
| 35 || 32 || 33.9 || .60 || .35 || .74 || 4.1 || 4.1 || 1.5 || .3 || 21.9
|-
| align="left" | 2009–10
| align="left" | Fastweb Casale
| 13 || 13 || 32.8 || .50 || .29 || .74 || 3.7 || 2.5 || 1.6 || .9 || 12.6
|-
| align="left" | 2009–10
| align="left" | Kepez Belediyespor
| 8 || 3 || 30.5 || .46 || .30 || .56 || 3.6 || 3.8 || 2.0 || .1 || 13.3
|-
| align="left" | 2010–11
| align="left" | Kepez Belediyespor
| 20 || 19 || 35.0 || .48 || .34 || .69 || 4.9 || 6.0 || 2.8 || .6 || 20.1
|-
| align="left" | 2011–12
| align="left" | Levski Sofia
| 36 || 32 || 27.2 || .60 || .31 || .71 || 3.0 || 3.4 || 1.4 || .2 || 14.4
|-
| align="left" | 2012–13
| align="left" | Darüşşafaka
| 34 || 34 || 33.2 || .49 || .33 || .74 || 4.6 || 4.9 || 1.1 || .4 || 17.1
|-
| align="left" | 2013–14
| align="left" | Yeşilgiresun Belediye
| 34 || 34 || 35.2 || .52 || .31 || .77 || 3.7 || 4.7 || 1.5 || .5 || 19.4
|-
| align="left" | 2014–15
| align="left" | Iowa Energy
| 10 || 10 || 33.9 || .48 || .36 || .79 || 4.9 || 3.6 || 1.2 || .2 || 12.3
|-
| align="left" | 2015–16
| align="left" | Afyon Belediye S.K.
| 35 || 34 || 35.3 || .56 || .31 || .74 || 4.6 || 5.8 || 1.5 || .3 || 20.1
|-
| align="left" | 2017–18
| align="left" | Byblos
| 9 || 9 || 35.2 || .46 || .22 || .77 || 3.8 || 6.2 || 1.6 || .7 || 19.2
|-
| align="left" | 2017–18
| align="left" | Istanbulspor
| 16 || 16 || 33.3 || .43 || .28 || .87 || 4.2 || 4.2 || 1.3 || .3 || 17.9
|-
| align="left" | 2018–19
| align="left" | Konyaspor
| 36 || 36 || 34.1 || .50 || .34 ||.76 || 5.7 || 5.7 || 1.7 || .3 || 19.8
|-
| align="left" | 2020–21
| align="left" | Manisa Belediye
| 27 || 22 || 31.2 || .51 || .30 ||.78 || 3.2 || 4.6 || 1.4 || .2 || 16.8
|-
| align="left" | Career
| align="left" | 
| 313 || 294 || 33.1 || .53 || .33 || .78 || 4.1 || 5.0 || 1.5 || .3 || 17.8

Balkan League

|-
| align="left" | 2008–09
| align="left" | Levski Sofia
| 10 || 10 || 33.9 || .60 || .35 || .74 || 4.7 || 3.9 || 1.6 || .3 || 20.4
|-
| align="left" | 2011–12
| align="left" | Levski Sofia
| 10 || 10 || 32.1 || .55 || .26 || .66 || 3.8 || 3.8 || .8 || .3 || 15.0
|-
| align="left" | Career
| align="left" | 
| 20 || 20 || 33.0 || .58 || .31 || .70 || 4.3 || 3.9 || 1.2 || .3 || 17.7

Personal life
Hall is the son of Kenneth Hogan and Mary Hall, and has a younger sister, Kimberly. His cousin, Tim Simon, played basketball at Stephen F. Austin State University.

References

External links
Colorado bio
Eurobasket.com Profile
NBA D-League Profile

1985 births
Living people
African-American basketball players
American expatriate basketball people in Cyprus
American expatriate basketball people in Bulgaria
American expatriate basketball people in Italy
American expatriate basketball people in Lebanon
American expatriate basketball people in Turkey
American expatriate basketball people in Venezuela
APOEL B.C. players
A.S. Junior Pallacanestro Casale players
Afyonkarahisar Belediyespor players
Basketball players from Houston
BC Levski Sofia players
Colorado Buffaloes men's basketball players
Darüşşafaka Basketbol players
Iowa Energy players
Jersey Village High School alumni
Kepez Belediyesi S.K. players
Fort Wayne Mad Ants players
Point guards
Shooting guards
Yeşilgiresun Belediye players
American men's basketball players
21st-century African-American sportspeople
20th-century African-American people